Mindarus harringtoni is an extinct species of aphid. The insect was discovered when Richard Harrington, a scientist and vice-president of the Royal Entomological Society of London, won an auction on eBay for a fossilized specimen, later to discover it was an unknown species. The fossil was bought from an individual from Lithuania.

The fossil was sent to Ole Heie, an aphid expert in Denmark, who confirmed the insect a new species, now extinct. The insect was named Mindarus harringtoni after Harrington, who first considered naming it Mindarus ebayi after the site he won it on.

The fossil is now housed in the Natural History Museum.

Mindarus harringtoni is thought to have fed on a tree called Pinus succinifera, which itself is long extinct.

See also
Coelopleurus exquisitus, another species discovered on eBay

References

†
Fossil taxa described in 2008
Cenozoic insects
Prehistoric insects of Europe
Extinct Hemiptera